Rakul Preet Singh (born 10 October 1990) is an Indian actress who predominantly works in Hindi, Telugu and  Tamil films. She has won several awards including a South Indian International Movie Award and a CineMAA Award. Singh has four Filmfare Awards South nominations to her credit.

Singh made her acting debut with the Kannada film Gilli (2009). She forayed to other South industries in 2013 with the Telugu film Venkatadri Express and Tamil film Thadaiyara Thaakka. She was next featured in notable Tamil and Telugu films like Loukyam (2014), Pandaga Chesko (2015), Sarrainodu (2016), Dhruva (2016), Nannaku Prematho (2016), Rarandoi Veduka Chudham (2017), Spyder (2017) and Theeran Adhigaaram Ondru (2017). Since then she has shifted her focus mainly to Hindi films. 

Singh entered Hindi cinema with the sleeper hit comedy film Yaariyan (2014). After a brief gap, she returned to Hindi films with the commercially successful romantic comedy De De Pyaar De (2019). She has since appeared in multiple Hindi movies, out of which she received appraisal for her roles in Runway 34 (2022), Doctor G (2022) and Chhatriwali (2023).

Early life 

Rakul Preet Singh was born on 10 October 1990 in a Sikh family in New Delhi. Rakul did her schooling from Army Public School, Dhaula Kuan and later completed a degree in mathematics at Jesus and Mary College. Her father was an army officer. Her mother is Rajender Kaur and father is Kulwinder Singh. Her younger brother, Aman Preet Singh, is set to make his Bollywood debut with film Ram Rajya.

Career

Debut and early roles (2009–2014) 

Singh, who said that she had always dreamt of being an actress, began her career in modelling at age 18 while she was still in college. In 2009 she made her acting debut in the Kannada film, Gilli, a remake of Selvaraghavan's 7G Rainbow Colony. She stated that she signed up the film "with the aim to earn a little extra pocket money" and that she was unaware "how big south Indian films were". She won critical acclaim for her role in the film before returning to complete her degree and compete in the 2011 Femina Miss India pageant. Apart from the People's Choice Miss Indiatimes, she won four subtitles at the pageant including Pantaloons Femina Miss Fresh Face, Femina Miss Talented, Femina Miss Beautiful Smile and Femina Miss Beautiful Eyes.

She returned to films in 2011, featuring opposite Siddharth Rajkumar in Keratam which was released both in Telugu and Tamil languages, though critics noted that "she got very little screen time". The film was also made in Tamil simultaneously titled as "Yuvan" with the same cast but different director. In 2012, she appeared in a supporting role in the Tamil film Thadaiyara Thaakka.

In Jan 2013 she appeared in a Tamil film titled Puthagam. In November 2013 she was seen in Venkatadri Express in Telugu, the latter becoming a commercial success and earning her first Best Actress nomination at the 61st Filmfare Awards South.

In 2014, she debuted in a starring role in Hindi with Divya Kumar's directorial debut Yaariyan, after which her third Tamil film Yennamo Yedho released. By mid-2014, she was working on three Telugu films simultaneously, which were directed by Sriwass, G. Nageswara Reddy,  and Gopichand Malineni. Sriwass's Loukyam and G. Nageswara Reddy's Current Theega were her next releases. She received positive reviews for her performances in both films, with 123Telugu claiming that she was "slowly becoming a star actress". She received her second Best Actress nomination at 62nd Filmfare Awards South. Her next released film was Pandaga Chesko in which she was starred opposite Ram Pothineni and directed by Gopichand Malineni.

Breakthrough in Telugu cinema and further (2015–2018) 
Singh was then selected as the female lead in half-a-dozen, four of which are high-profile Telugu films: Surender Reddy's Kick 2 opposite Ravi Teja, Srinu Vaitla's Bruce Lee opposite Ram Charan, Sukumar's Nannaku Prematho opposite Jr. Ntr and Boyapati Srinu's Sarrainodu opposite Allu Arjun. She earned her first Best Actress (Telugu) award at 6th South Indian International Movie Awards. In January 2016 she signed the film Jaya Janaki Nayaka under the direction of Boyapati Srinu opposite Bellamkonda Sreenivas In February 2016 she signed Surender Reddy's Dhruva starring opposite Ram Charan for the second time.

In early March 2016 she signed Gopichand Malineni's film Winner starring with Sai Dharam Tej for the first time. In early July 2016, she signed to AR Murugadoss' bilingual film opposite to Mahesh Babu,  titled Spyder. In September 2016 she signed another Telugu film titled Rarandoi Veduka Chudham directed by Kalyan Krishna starring opposite Naga Chaitanya. The movie was released on 26 May which was a huge blockbuster.

In Dec 2016, she signed her next film titled Theeran Adhigaaram Ondru to pair opposite Karthi. After a small sabbatical in Hindi films, she appeared in Neeraj Pandey's Aiyaary starring opposite Sidharth Malhotra, released in February.

Career fluctuations and success (2019–present) 

In 2019, she took on a guest role in Nandamuri Balakrishna's NTR: Kathanayakudu as Sridevi. She then went on to play the female lead in Dev opposite Karthi for the second time. Singh appeared with Ajay Devgn and Tabu in Luv Ranjan's Bollywood romcom, De De Pyaar De, released on 17 May 2019. The same month, she appeared in Selvaraghavan's NGK opposite Suriya. Her fifth release of 2019 was a Telugu romantic comedy film Manmadhudu 2, produced by Nagarjuna Akkineni and directed by Rahul Ravindran. In the same year, she appeared in Milap Milan Zaveri's action drama Marjaavaan, alongside Ritesh Deshmukh, Sidharth Malhotra and Tara Sutaria.

In 2021, Singh starred in the Chandra Sekhar Yeleti-directed film Check, alongside Nithiin and in Sardar Ka Grandson opposite Arjun Kapoor. Her Telugu film Konda Polam directed by Krish alongside Panja Vaisshnav Tej was released on 8 October. In her review about the film, Neeshita Nyayapati of The Times of India wrote about Singh that "Rakul is a delight as Obu and the dubbing for her character seems almost pitch-perfect, fitting right into the skin of the character. She's a ray of sunshine in an otherwise muted film".

Her first release in 2022 came with the action film Attack, co-starring John Abraham and Jacqueline Fernandez, a Lakshya Raj Anand's directorial debut. It received mixed reviews. This was followed by the release of Runway 34 in which she starred alongside Ajay Devgn and Amitabh Bachchan. Both the films where commercial failures. She also featured in Indra Kumar's slice-of-life comedy Thank God alongside Devgn and Sidharth Malhotra, which was a box office failure. Her next release was Anubhuti Kashyap's Doctor G in which she was paired opposite Ayushmann Khurrana. Doctor G received positive reviews from the critics and was average at the box office. Rakul also paired up with Akshay Kumar in Cuttputtli which was released on Disney+ Hotstar.

Her first release in 2023 was the social family entertainer film Chhatriwali directed by Tejas Prabha Vijay Deoskar. The film was released on Zee5. She received praise from the critics for her performance. The Hindu noted that Singh "shines" in her role.

Singh has four upcoming films in various stages of production. She has signed two Tamil films: S. Shankar's vigilante-action film Indian 2 and the science fiction film Ayalaan opposite Sivakarthikeyan.  She also has a Tamil-Telugu bilingual titled 31 October Ladies Night. She is also filming currently for Mudassar Aziz's Meri Patni Ka Remake, which also stars Arjun Kapoor and Bhumi Pednekar.

Personal life and other work 

Singh is in a relationship with actor and producer Jackky Bhagnani. As of 2020, Singh lives in Hyderabad and has a house in Mumbai.

In 2017, Singh was appointed as the brand ambassador for Beti Bachao, Beti Padhao programme by the Government of Telangana. She became the mentor of the South Zone during the Femina Miss India 2018 contest. Singh has often walked the ramp for Lakshmi Manchu's Charity Fashion show, for the NGO "Teach for Change". During Covid-19 crisis, she provided food to 200-250 families in a slum in Gurugram and also did a crowdfunding to raise funds for Covid relief.

Singh has an active franchise of three functional training gyms of F45 Training. Two of them are in Hyderabad, located in the suburbs of Gachibowli and Kokapet, while the other is in Visakhapatnam. In 2021, Singh co-founded and launched an app called "Starring You", with her brother Aman. It helps aspirants overcome the hurdle of physical distances and boundaries.

Public image 
Singh is considered among the most popular actor of Telugu cinema. She stood at the 17th place on Forbes India's most influential stars on Instagram in South cinema for the year 2021. 

Filmfare'''s Tanisha Bhattacharya stated that Singh has an "impressive filmography", she said, "Rakul's stellar roles showcase how talented the actress is. She is proving her mettle of being a bankable actor." Pratiksha Acharya of Grazia'' noted, "Walking the line between South Indian cinema and Bollywood, Rakul has quickly made herself a force to reckon with."

Singh has frequently featured in Times' 50 Most Desirable Woman list. She ranked 34th in 2018, 24th in 2019, and 14th in 2020. In Hyderabad Times' 30 Most Desirable Woman list, she was placed 9th in 2018, 7th in 2019 and in 2020. She ranked 11th in 2018 and 12th in 2019 in Chennai Times' 30 Most Desirable Woman. Singh is a prominent celebrity endorser for brands and products including Eva, Liberty Shoes and AccessHer.

Filmography

Films

Music videos

Awards and nominations

References

External links 
 
 
 

Living people
1990 births
21st-century Indian actresses
Punjabi people
Actresses from New Delhi
Actresses in Kannada cinema
Actresses in Tamil cinema
Actresses in Telugu cinema
Female models from Delhi
Indian film actresses
People from New Delhi
Indian Sikhs
Delhi University alumni
South Indian International Movie Awards winners